Division No. 6 is a census division in the central part of the island of Newfoundland in the province of Newfoundland and Labrador, Canada.  It is divided into 16 parts; 12 towns and four unorganized subdivisions.

The division had a population of 38,345 in the Canada 2016 Census.

Towns
Appleton
Badger
Bishop's Falls
Botwood
Buchans
Gander
Glenwood
Grand Falls-Windsor
Millertown
Norris Arm
Northern Arm
Peterview

Unorganized subdivisions
Subdivision A
Subdivision C
Subdivision D
Subdivision E

Demographics

References

Sources
 

006